Dorothee or Dorothée is a German or French (respectively) female given name, a variant of Dorothy. Notable people with this name include:
Dorothée (born 1953), French singer
Dorothee Bär (born 1978), German politician
Dorothee Bauer (born 1983), German Olympic sport shooter
Dorothée Berryman (born 1948), Canadian actress
Dorothee Bohle (born 1964), German political scientist
Dorothée de Courlande or Dorothée de Dino (1793–1862), German princess
Dorothée Dupuis (born 1980), French art curator, critic, and publisher
Dorothee Elmiger (born 1985), Swiss writer
Dorothée Gilbert (born 1983), French ballerina
Dorothee Haroske (born 1968), German mathematician
Dorothée Jemma (born 1956), French voice actress
Dorothée Le Maître (1896–1990), French paleontologist
Dorothée Lima (male), Dahomean newspaper editor and publisher
Dorothee Kern (born 1966), German-American basketball player and biochemist
Dorothee Metlitzki (1914–2001), German-American author and English professor
Dorothee Mields (born 1971), German singer
Dorothée de Monfreid (born 1973), French author and illustrator
Dorothée Munyaneza (born 1982), British-Rwandan singer, actress, dancer and choreographer
Dorothee Oberlinger (born 1969), German musician and professor
Dorothee Pesch (born 1969, aka Doro), German singer-songwriter
Dorothée Pullinger (1894–1986), French-English automobile engineer
Dorothee Rätsch (born 1940), German sculptor
Dorothee Schneider (born 1969), German dressage rider
Dorothée Smith (aka SMITH), French artist
Dorothee Sölle (1929–2003, aka Dorothee Steffensky-Sölle, Dorothee Nipperdey), German liberation theologian
Dorothee Stapelfeldt (born 1956), German politician
Dorothée de Talleyrand-Périgord (1862–1948), French aristocrat
Dorothee Elisabeth Tretschlaff (1686–1701), German women executed for witchcraft
Dorothee Vieth (born 1960), German Paralympic cyclist
Dorothee Wenner, German film curator and journalist
Dorothee Wilms (born 1929), German politician

See also
Dorothee Island, an island in Australia
Jean-Félix Dorothée, French footballer